Lobation is a characteristic of the cell nucleus of certain granulocytes, which are types of white blood cells, where the nucleus is segmented into two or more connected lobes. Of the four types of granulocyte only the mast cell is not lobated.

Lobation is also a characteristic of megakaryocytes in the bone marrow.

References

Cell nucleus